India and Pakistan had a dispute over the sharing of water rights to the Indus River and its tributaries in April 1948, about eight months after their independence. The East Punjab province of India shut off water running to the West Punjab province of Pakistan via the main branches of the Upper Bari Doab Canal as well as the Dipalpur Canal from the Ferozepur Headworks.  It was resumed after five weeks when Pakistan agreed to attend an Inter-Dominion conference to negotiate an agreement. The critical nature of the Indian action caused deep apprehensions in Pakistan, which were eventually resolved only with the signing of the Indus Waters Treaty in 1960.

See also
 Water conflict
 Water resources law

References

Bibliography 
 
 

India–Pakistan relations
1948 in India
1948 in Pakistan
Indus basin
Water conflicts